Cranbrook railway station is a disused English station which was on the closed Hawkhurst Branch in Kent, England.

Background
The station was equipped with a single 300 ft platform on the down side, together with a goods only loop. The stationmaster's house was situated on the platform, with a large goods yard and red brick goods shed to the rear. A warehouse used by a local corn merchant was at the Goudhurst end of the yard.

The station's name was a little deceptive in that the town of Cranbrook was two miles away. When the line was originally being constructed, local landowners had demanded high prices for the sale of their agricultural land and the South Eastern Railway had refused, amending the route of the line so that Cranbrook Station was actually located in Hartley. The villagers came to regret being excluded from the line, and an attempt was made to have a light railway constructed to Hartley. This was never realised.

The station was closed with the line on 12 June 1961. The station building was used for several years by Brian O'Donoghue and Keith Harding as "Cranbrook Station Pottery". This has now closed and it is reported that the station building is in poor condition, although the stationmaster's house is well preserved.

Notes

References

External links
 Cranbrook railway station at Disused-Stations.org.uk
 Cranbrook station on navigable 1940 O. S. map
Signal diagram, 1934

Disused railway stations in Kent
Railway stations in Great Britain opened in 1893
Railway stations in Great Britain closed in 1961
1893 establishments in England
1961 disestablishments in England
Former South Eastern Railway (UK) stations